All Fired Up is a 1982 French comedy film directed by Jean-Paul Rappeneau, starring Yves Montand and Isabelle Adjani. It tells the story of a man who works with shady casino operations abroad. When he returns to Paris in need of money, he is unaware that his eldest daughter has begun to work for the ministry of finance. The film premiered on 13 January 1982. It had 2,279,445 admissions in France.

Cast
 Yves Montand as Victor Valance
 Isabelle Adjani as Pauline Valance
 Alain Souchon as Antoine Quentin 
 Lauren Hutton as Jane 
 Jean-Luc Bideau as Raoul Sarazin 
 Pinkas Braun as Monsieur Nash 
 Jean-Pierre Miquel as the minister of finance
 Jean Rougerie as the doctor
 Madeleine Cheminat as Mme Valance
 Jeanne Lallemand as Delphine Valance 
 Amélie Gonin as Juliette Valance
 Facundo Bo as Nash' secretary
 Pierre Le Rumeur as M. Brenno
 Rose Thierry as Mme Chapon

References

1982 comedy films
1982 films
Films directed by Jean-Paul Rappeneau
Films set in Paris
French comedy films
1980s French-language films
Films with screenplays by Jean-Paul Rappeneau
1980s French films

External links